Lecca or Leca is a given name and a surname. Notable persons with that name include:

Lecca (singer), Japanese singer

Personal name 
Leca of Cătun (d. 1616), political figure

People with the surname
Dimitrie Lecca (1832–1888), Moldavian-born Romanian soldier and politician
Celso Garrido Lecca (born 1926), Peruvian composer
Constantin Lecca (1807–1887), Romanian painter and art professor
Gheorghe Lecca (1831–1885), Moldavian-born Romanian politician
Haralamb Lecca (1873–1920), Romanian poet, playwright, and translator
Linda Laura Lecca (born 1988), Peruvian boxer
Radu Lecca (1890–1980), Romanian spy, journalist, civil servant and convicted war criminal

Romanian-language surnames